A mine clearance organization, or demining organization, is an organization involved in the removal of landmines and unexploded ordnance (UXO) for military, humanitarian, or commercial reasons. Demining includes mine clearance (actual removal and destruction of landmines/UXO from the ground), as well as surveying, mapping and marking of hazardous areas.

The broader realm of mine action also includes advocacy, victim assistance, antipersonnel mine stockpile destruction, mine risk education and research. The aim is to clear land so that civilians can return to their homes and their everyday routines without the threat of landmines and unexploded remnants of war (ERW), which include unexploded ordnance and abandoned explosive ordnance. This means that all the mines and ERW affecting the places where ordinary people live must be cleared, and their safety in areas that have been cleared must be guaranteed. Mines are cleared and the areas are verified so that they can say that the land is now safe, and people can use it without worrying about the weapons.

Government
After the Second World War, large-scale multinational naval mine clearance operations were carried out by the International Central Mine Clearance Board, and, in northern European waters, by the German Mine Sweeping Administration. A French officer of the Int'l Central Mine Clearance Board's subordinate Mediterranean Zone Board witnessed "Operation Retail" on 12–13 November 1946, the Royal Navy clearance of sea mines during the Corfu Channel incident.

In the 21st century, the main governments that fund humanitarian mine clearance are the United States (US), the European Union (EU), Japan, Norway, and the Netherlands, which accounted in 2014 for 72% of all international funding.  Germany, the UK, and Denmark are also significant donors.

Danish Demining Group

Danish Demining Group (DDG) was established in 1997 and today functions as a humanitarian mine action unit within the Danish Refugee Council (DRC), hence benefiting from synergies in cooperation. As of August 2012, DDG is operating with clearance of mines and explosive remnants of war in Afghanistan, Iraq, Libya, Somalia (including Somaliland), Sri Lanka, South Sudan, Uganda, Ukraine and Yemen. DDG also works with armed violence reduction in several countries.

Non-Governmental organizations (NGOs)

APOPO

APOPO trains Giant pouched rats from East Africa to detect landmines. This unusual idea has been developed into a competitive technology by a group of Belgian and Tanzanian researchers and animal trainers. APOPO is a non-profit organization that has partnered with the Belgian Government, Geneva International Centre for Humanitarian Demining (GICHD), the European Union (EU), the Province of Antwerp (Belgium), the Flemish Community, the US Army, the World Bank and private donors. It has further partnered in demining with Menschen gegen Minen (MgM), Norwegian People's Aid (NPA), Accelerated Demining Programme (ADP), Handicap International (HI) and Empresa Moçambicana de Desminagem (EMD).

DanChurchAid

DanChurchAid (Folkekirkens Nødhjælp) is one of the major Danish humanitarian non governmental organisations (NGO), working with churches and non-religious civil organizations to assist the poor with dignity. DCA mine action is currently involved in comprehensive mine action programmes in Albania, Eritrea, Lebanon, Sudan and Ingushetia.

Demining Research Community

The Demining Research Community is an American nonprofit organization that researches and develops uses of remote sensing and machine learning to improve the efficiency and safety of landmine and unexploded ordnance (UXO) detection.

DEMIRA

DEMIRA (Deutsche Minenraeumer e.V.) is an international, humanitarian, non-governmental organization (NGO) registered in Germany. DEMIRA NGO was founded in 1996 in order to provide humanitarian mine clearance, EOD (Explosive Ordnance Disposal), emergency medical aid and disaster relief to people living in postwar countries and to victims of natural disasters and civil unrest.

Golden West Humanitarian Foundation 
The Golden West Humanitarian Foundation is an American nonprofit organization that developed mine clearance technology.

HAMAP-Humanitaire 
Created in 1999, HAMAP-Humanitaire is a French non-governmental organization (NGO)  for development aid. Its vocation is to take concrete action so that more men, women and children can access drinking water, sanitation, education, health and safety (demining). The NGO HAMAP-Humanitaire currently has projects in 14 countries.

The HALO Trust

The Hazardous Area Life-Support Organization (HALO Trust) is a non-political, non-religious, non-governmental mine clearance organisation registered in Britain and the United States. Founded in 1988, it is the world's oldest international humanitarian demining NGO, and it is the largest with over 8,000 deminers and support staff operational in over 20 countries. By early 2006 HALO had cleared over 5,000,000 mines and UXO around the world. HALO's mission is to "protect lives and restore the livelihoods of those affected by conflict."

Humanity and Inclusion

Humanity and Inclusion (formerly Handicap International) is one of the 6 founding members of the International Campaign to Ban Landmines which received the Nobel Peace Prize in 1997. Handicap International France and Belgium are involved into Mine Risk Education and demining projects in Afghanistan, Kosovo, Mozambique, and Somalia.

Horizon

Horizon Organisation for Post Conflict Environment Management (OPCEM) is an ex-servicemen's endeavour NGO (Charitable Trust) founded by senior retired Indian Army Officers in 2001. Horizon OPCEM is the first Indian NGO by, of and for Indian Ex Servicemen, dedicated to Post Conflict Environment Management with core competence in Humanitarian Demining. Founded by retired officers of the Indian Army in 2001, it was registered as a Society on 16 Jan 2002. Horizon OPCEM has done seven Humanitarian Demining Projects in Sri Lanka and has received funding from the Norwegian People's Aid.

INTERSOS

INTERSOS is an independent no-profit humanitarian organization committed to assist the victims of natural disasters and armed conflicts. It was founded in 1992 with the active support of Italian Trade Unions. INTERSOS has a flexible operational structure, with the central headquarters in Rome which is in charge of planning and coordination of operations, and various field offices in the countries of operation.

Japan Mine Action Service

Japan Mine Action Service (JMAS) is a Japanese nonprofit organization established in 2002 that is headed by a mine expert who retired from the Self-Defense Force. The JMAS is active mainly in Cambodia and Afghanistan.

Mine Awareness Trust

The Mines Awareness Trust (MAT) is a charitable organisation that endeavours to save the lives and limbs of ordinary people from the unexploded debris of war. Ben Remfrey formed the Trust in May 1999 as a direct response to the war in Kosovo.

Mines Advisory Group

The Mines Advisory Group (MAG) has operated since 1989. Having worked on a variety of conflict-related projects in around 35 countries, MAG was co-laureate of the 1997 Nobel Peace Prize, awarded for their work with the International Campaign to Ban Landmines. MAG has worked in over 40 countries since 1989 and currently has operations in Angola, Burundi, Cambodia, Chad, Democratic Republic of Congo, Honduras, Iraq, Lao P.D.R., Lebanon, Libya, Republic of Congo, Somalia, South Sudan, Sri Lanka, and Vietnam.

Mineseeker Operations and Mineseeker Foundation

The Mineseeker Foundation claims that it can locate mined areas more quickly and at a fraction of the cost of systems currently employed, using techniques that are significantly safer for the operators than most other methods. Initially the company will focus on identifying designated mined areas where there are, in fact, no mines, in order to release this land back to the community for agricultural or commercial development and rapidly reduce the overall scale of the clearance problem.

Menschen gegen Minen (MgM)

Menschen gegen Minen (People against Landmines) was founded on January 16, 1996, in Germany. The goal was to establish a humanitarian mine clearance organization which would offer its services to non-governmental organizations (NGOs) dedicated to re-establishing the infrastructure of dangerous regions in post war scenarios. Hendrik Ehlers and Hans Georg Kruessen founded MgM together with others in 1996. Today they are Managing Directors and active Managers of all demining operations at the same time. They have been working since 1992 in the field of humanitarian mine clearance and the destruction of dangerous ammunition in Southern Africa. They possess a wealth of practical experience through operations management, mined area survey, demining and the destruction of explosives (EOD).

No More Landmines

No More Landmines was a United Kingdom-based humanitarian landmine relief charity. The charity focused on landmine and unexploded ordnance removal, mine risk education programmes, and rehabilitation of survivors of landmine injuries. The trust ceased trading on 15 June 2009 and passed its assets on to the Mines Awareness Trust.

Norwegian People's Aid

Norwegian People's Aid (NPA) is one of Norway's largest non-governmental organisations, founded in 1939. Based upon the principles of solidarity, unity, human dignity, peace and freedom, NPA is involved in more than 400 projects in 30 countries. NPA has been involved in mine action since 1992. Cambodia was the first country where NPA started mine clearance and the organisation has grown considerably since then. NPA sits in the CC of the ICBL and the core group of LM and participates in different activities with SWG and SAC. As of December 2011, NPA was involved in mine action in sixteen countries in Africa, Asia, the Middle East, and Europe.

Response International

Response International is a UK registered charity established in 1993 to support victims of violent conflict. Over the last decade successful multi-sector programmes have been implemented in Angola, Bosnia, Chechnya, Kosovo, Lebanon and Pakistan. The objective of these programmes is to design and implement projects that offer immediate relief to victims of conflict and provide sustainable conditions to enable longer term development. Response International's projects have included landmine clearance and landmine awareness and victim rehabilitation.

Saint Barbara Foundation

Stiftung Sankt Barbara Deutschland - Saint Barbara Foundation (SBF) is a humanitarian foundation registered in Germany. Since 1995 SBF clears landmines and ERW and supports different projects in rehabilitation and assistance for mine victims. Former countries of engagement were Angola, Sudan, Ethiopia and Somaliland, actually SBF is working in Libya. SBF's projects include landmine clearance, landmine awareness and victim rehabilitation.

Fondation suisse de déminage (FSD)

The Fondation suisse de déminage (FSD) was formed in 1997 in Geneva, Switzerland. FSD is a humanitarian organisation specialising in the removal of the hazardous remnants of war, such as land mines, unexploded shells from artillery and tank fire, air-dropped bombs, and all manner of dangerous, unexploded military ordnance. FSD's work is conducted for humanitarian purposes. FSD is a non-political, non-aligned, independent, non-government organisation based in Geneva.

FSD also conducts disaster relief work, with major interventions in Sri Lanka following the 2004 Indian Ocean tsunami and during the January–March 2008 cold weather crisis in Tajikistan. FSD has conducted interventions in 21 countries since 1998, and is currently engaged in implementing 8 programmes worldwide, these are Afghanistan, Centrafrican Republic, Chad, Colombia, Iraq, Philippines, Tajikistan and Ukraine. FSD also conducted support operations for the World Food Programme (WFP) as a stand-by partner from 2001.

Corporate

1st Line Defence

1st Line Defence is an Unexploded Ordnance (UXO), Explosive Ordnance Disposal (EOD) and Landmine clearance company. 1st Line Defence operate globally and they are the risk mitigation consultants chosen by many organisations due to being UK Home Office Authorised and Police Licensed – and add invaluable expertise and support to construction projects of all sizes and scopes.

6 Alpha Associates

6 Alpha Associates provides independent consultancy in mine clearance, unexploded ordnance (UXO) and Explosive Ordnance Disposal (EOD). The company is based in the UK and operates globally, primarily working with the energy, extractives and construction industries. 6 Alpha also provides advice on security, risk management, business continuity and crisis management.

G4S Ordnance Management

G4S Ordnance Management is a commercial leader in the environmental remediation of landmine, unexploded ordnance (UXO) and Explosive Remnants of War (ERW) pollution, clearing battlefields and the management of conventional weapons. Over the past 14 years, G4S Ordnance Management has operated in over 20 different countries including Afghanistan, Bosnia, Chile, Cyprus, Iraq, Lao PDR, Lebanon, Mozambique, Nepal, Sakhalin Island (Russia) and Sudan. G4S Ordnance Management was originally part of ArmorGroup International, which was acquired by G4S plc in April 2008.

BACTEC International (rebranded to become SafeLane Global in 2018)

BACTEC rebranded to become SafeLane Global on October 1, 2018.  It is an explosive ordnance disposal (EOD) and landmine clearance company. BACTEC was established in 1991 to provide risk mitigation services for unexploded ordnance and landmine clearance, supporting construction projects and worldwide explosive ordnance clearance initiatives.  It was awarded the clearance contracts to demine the Falkland Islands.

Crosstech SA

Crosstech SA is a commercial company that is 100% owned by the FSD. It was set up to serve the needs of customers (such as the UN in Sudan) who prefer to deal with a commercial entity, rather than a non-governmental organisation. The aim of Crosstech SA is to provide mine action services, and to provide services to FSD. Even though Crosstech SA is a commercial company, it has to exercise its activity under the supervision of the Swiss government's department for foundations.

The Development Initiative

The Development Initiative (TDI) is a project management organisation managing projects in remote, extreme or post-conflict environments. TDI provided landmine clearance, battle area clearance, explosive ordnance disposal and consultancy, detection dogs, logistics and remote operations support. TDI has experience of working in theatres such as Afghanistan, Iraq, Bosnia, Laos, Sudan, Somalia, Zimbabwe, Mozambique, Taiwan and Kuwait.

Horizon Assignments
Horizon Assignments (India) Pvt Ltd was founded as an adjunct to Horizon OPCEM with a view to realizing its objectives of service to humanity and supplement its funding. The Organisation was registered on 23 October 2003 under Companies Act 1956. The organization is ISO 9001-2008 certified and accredited globally by United Nations for Humanitarian Demining. HORIZON has undertaken 16 demining projects in Sri Lanka from 2003 till 2012 and a project in Jordan in 2006-07. Horizon had received funding from The Government of India for the demining projects in Sri Lanka. Since September 2012, Horizon has been working on Explosive Ordnance Disposal (EOD) / UXO survey and detection as a part of soil remediation project under taken by The Energy and Resources Institute (TERI), India for Kuwait Oil company (KOC) in Kuwait. In Nov- Dec 2014, HORIZON successfully completed UXO Anomaly Avoidance Project for AMEC's Soil sampling Activity. In Kuwait, Horizon has carried out EOD/UXO survey of more than 400,000 sq m and Radiological Survey of more than 270,000 sq m area. HORIZON has so far detected and destroyed around 124,630 land mines/UXO's/devices and have cleared 100,050,554 sq m of infected area along with Radiological Survey of more than 320,000 sq m of area in Kuwait Oil Company. Horizon's website is www.horizon-groupindia.com.

Mechem Demining

Mechem Demining is a division of the South African state-owned aerospace and defence equipment company Denel. Active in the field of humanitarian demining since 1991, Mechem utilises the considerable experience gained through three decades of involvement with the SANDF and other clients in providing landmine countermeasures and mine resistant vehicles and equipment. Mechem's demining operations are in full compliance with the International Mine Action Standards (IMAS).

Mine Clearing Corp.

Mine Clearing Corp. is developing a landmine detection and mapping system. The system will scan contaminated areas using an Unmanned Airborne Vehicle using patented sensor arrays and GPS software. The results will produce a detailed map of land mine locations thus increasing the productivity of landmine detection.

Minefree

Minefree is Israel's biggest demining contractor. MINEFREE is specialized in conducting high complexity projects in the fields of demining, UXO Clearance, BAC, Stockpile Destruction and EOD. MINEFREE's leadership consists of ex-IDF Generals, holding more than 40 years experience in combat engineering related fields.

MineTech International (rebranded to become SafeLane Global in 2018)

Along with BacTec, MineTech International rebranded to become SafeLane Global in 2018.  It was established in 1989 and is a mine and unexploded ordnance clearance company. It works for commercial companies and humanitarian organisations to enable them to conduct business in countries plagued by mines and UXO.

MineTech offers services including manual, mechanical and canine mine detection and clearance, mine risk education and explosive detection dog teams. Its headquarters are in the UK, and it has a canine training school in South Africa.

RONCO Consulting

RONCO Consulting has undertaken mine and unexploded ordnance (UXO) clearance operations in over 35 countries since 1989. RONCO employs nearly 200 technical advisors skilled in the training and implementation of mine/UXO clearance and disposal and improvised explosive ordnance disposal programs. RONCO specializes in the following fields: Manual Demining, Mine Detection Dogs, Explosives Detection Dogs, Explosive Ordnance Disposal, Improvised Explosive Ordnance Disposal, Basic /Advanced Trauma Life Support, Security Management. Ronco was acquired by G4S/Wackenhut in March 2008.

Ukroboronservice
Ukroboronservice is a Ukrainian state-owned company for export and import of military and special purpose products and services that includes a Humanitarian Demining Centre. The center performs Manual and Mechanical Demining, demining with the use of MDD and EDD, EOD, IEDD, BAC, MRE, First aid courses, Refresher trainings.

Other commercial organisations

 DynCorp International
 EOD Technology, Inc.
 UXB International
 Westminster International ltd

Military

Military mine clearance agencies focus on the process undertaken by soldiers to clear a safe path so they can advance during conflict. The military process of mine clearance only clears mines that block strategic pathways required in the advance or retreat of soldiers at war. The military term used for mine clearance is breaching. This process accepts that limited casualties may occur.

Area cleared

See also

 Cluster bomb
 Improvised explosive device
 Unexploded ordnance

References

Further reading

External links
 MgM Demining - Robots and other research
 TDI - the development initiative
 The International Committee of the Red Cross on Landmines
 Center for International Stabilization and Recovery

Safety organizations